Ezekiel 37 is the thirty-seventh chapter of the Book of Ezekiel in the Hebrew Bible or the Old Testament of the Christian Bible. This book contains the prophecies attributed to the prophet/priest Ezekiel, and is one of the Nevi'im (Prophets). This chapter contains a vision of the resurrection of dry bones, widely known as the Vision of the Valley of Dry Bones, in which Ezekiel at last assures the captives in Babylon that they will return from exile.

Text
The original text was written in the Hebrew language. This chapter is divided into 28 verses.

Textual witnesses
Some early manuscripts containing the text of this chapter in Hebrew are of the Masoretic Text tradition, which includes the Codex Cairensis (895), the Petersburg Codex of the Prophets (916), Aleppo Codex (10th century), and Codex Leningradensis (1008). Fragments containing parts of this chapter were found among the Dead Sea Scrolls, that is, the Ezekiel Scroll from Masada (Mas 1d; MasEzek; 1–50 CE) with extant verses 1–14, 16, 23, 28. Another witness is the Pseudo-Ezekiel.

There is also a translation into Koine Greek known as the Septuagint, made in the last few centuries BC. Extant ancient manuscripts of the Septuagint version include Codex Vaticanus (B; B; 4th century), Codex Alexandrinus (A; A; 5th century) and Codex Marchalianus (Q; Q; 6th century).

Structure
The New King James Version groups this chapter into two sections:
 = The Dry Bones Live
 = One Kingdom, One King

Verse 9

 "Son of man": this phrase is used 93 times to address Ezekiel.
 "Breath" (Hebrew:  rū-akh): in this sense, "breath of life", can also translated to "wind", "spirit", or "animus."

Verse 16-17

Pope John Paul II uses this "simple sign" from Ezekiel as an image of both "missionary and ecumenical endeavour" in his 1995 encyclical letter Ut Unum Sint: On commitment to Ecumenism.

Within the Church of Jesus Christ of Latter-day Saints this is understood to be a reference to the Book of Mormon (Stick of Joseph) and the Bible (Stick of Judah) coming together and working as one.

Verse 24
 David My servant shall be king over them, and they shall all have one shepherd;
 they shall also walk in My judgments and observe My statutes, and do them.
This verse refers a person coming from the House of David as "the servant of God", one shepherd of Israel, who will rule over the House of Judah (verse 16) and over the Tribe of Joseph (verse 17), so that he will "make them one stick, and they shall be one in mine hand" (verse 19), in a single nation of Israel.

See also

David
Ephraim
Israel
Jacob
Joseph
Judah
Old Testament messianic prophecies quoted in the New Testament
Related Bible parts: Genesis 2, 2 Samuel 7, John 1, John 2

Notes

References

Bibliography
Blenkinsopp, Joseph. "A history of prophecy in Israel" (Westminster John Knox Press, 1996)

External links

Jewish
Ezekiel 37 Hebrew with Parallel English
Ezekiel 37 Hebrew with Rashi's Commentary

Christian
Ezekiel 37 English Translation with Parallel Latin Vulgate

37